Witham Way Country Park is a country park in Boston, Lincolnshire, England.

Facilities
There is walking, cycling, horse riding, children's play areas, fishing, camping, bird watching, outdoor sports, a picnic area, an orchard and the River Witham passes through the park. The park is adjacent to Boston Town F. C. A Parkrun takes place every Saturday starting at 9am.

Nature
The country park is a Local Nature Reserve and offers the local wildlife several habitats including woodland, grassland and scrub. A wildflower meadow attracts bees and there is a bug park attracting insects, butterflies and bees. Owls are nesting in bird boxes that have been sited.

References

Country parks in Lincolnshire
Parks and open spaces in Lincolnshire